Greider is a surname. Notable people with the surname include:

 Carol W. Greider (born 1961), American molecular biologist
 Gerald Greider (1923–1982), Republican politician in Wisconsin, USA
 Göran Greider (born 1959), Swedish social democratic journalist, author and poet
 William Greider (1936–2019), American economics author